"How Could an Angel Break My Heart" is a song by American singer and songwriter Toni Braxton, released in November 1997 as the fourth and final single from her second studio album, Secrets (1996). The song, co-written by Braxton and Babyface and produced by Babyface, features Kenny G on the saxophone. At the time of this single's release, Secrets had reached five-time Platinum status by the RIAA.

Critical reception
British magazine Music Week gave "How Could an Angel Break My Heart" three out of five, adding that "Braxton looks to a big ballad to return her to the Top 10 with this fourth radio-friendly cut". In an retrospective review, Pop Rescue described the song as "a-wash with luxurious strings and haunting saxophone, as Toni’s somewhat sad vocals weave their way through this gentle ballad." Richard Harrington from The Washington Post complimented it as a "fine cut".

Music video
A music video was produced to promote the single, directed by Iain Softley. It follows the lyrical content of the relationship between Braxton and her lover. He has left her for another woman and she is left to pick up the pieces.

The remix version of the song has the storyline laid out a little differently, with Babyface singing back to her and duetting with her from the second verse. Babyface's vocals replace Kenny G's saxophone parts.

Track listings and formats
 UK CD 1 and European CD single
"How Could an Angel Break My Heart" (Album Version) – 4:20
"How Could an Angel Break My Heart" (Remix Version featuring Babyface) – 4:21
"How Could an Angel Break My Heart" (Album Instrumental) – 4:21
"How Could an Angel Break My Heart" (Remix Instrumental) – 4:21

 UK CD 2
"How Could an Angel Break My Heart" – 4:20
"Breathe Again" – 4:29
"Another Sad Love Song" – 5:01
"Love Shoulda Brought You Home" – 4:56

Personnel and credits

Credits adapted from album liner notes.

 Toni Braxton: lead vocals, background vocals, writer
 Kenneth "Babyface" Edmonds: writer, producer, keyboards, programming
 Kenny G: saxophone
 Greg Phillinganes: piano, rhodes
 Nathan East: bass
 Jeremy Lubbock: arranger and conductor (strings)
 Brad Gilderman: recording

 Al Schmitt: recording (strings)
 Mick Guzauski: mixing
 Paul Boutin, Robbes Stieglietz, Kyle Bess, Brandon Harris: assistant engineers
 Richard Huredia, Jin Choi, Jon Shrive, Bill Kinsley, Brad Haehnel: assistant engineers
 Randy Walker: midi programming
 Ivy Skoff: production coordinator

Charts

References

1990s ballads
1996 songs
1997 singles
Toni Braxton songs
Kenny G songs
Songs written by Babyface (musician)
Songs written by Toni Braxton
Song recordings produced by Babyface (musician)
LaFace Records singles